Hathor 8 - Coptic Calendar - Hathor 10

The ninth day of the Coptic month of Hathor, the third month of the Coptic year. On a common year, this day corresponds to November 5, of the Julian Calendar, and November 18, of the Gregorian Calendar.  This day falls in the Coptic season of Peret, the season of emergence.

Commemorations

Saints 

 The departure of Pope Isaac, the forty-first Patriarch of the See of Saint Mark

Other commemorations 

 The assembly of the First Ecumenical Council at Nicaea
 The consecration of the Saint Mark Cathedral in Abbasia, Cairo

References 

Days of the Coptic calendar